Afanasij Poliszczuk (born 28 April 1903, date of death unknown) was a Ukrainian Soviet military officer, Brigadier General of the Polish Army and a veterinarian. He came from Ukraine. He ended four-year veterinary school and five-year studies at Institute of Veterinary. He was the officer of Red Army, took the part in Second World War, in August 1943 was sent to military service in Polish Army, since 1944 he was the chief of veterinary service in First Polish Army. After war he served in Ministry of National Defence. In the years 1945-1946 has extramurally studied at Warsaw University.

Decorations 
 Officer's Cross of Order of Polonia Restituta (1945)
 Order of the Cross of Grunwald - 3rd class (1945)
 Gold Cross of Merit (1946)
 Silver Cross of Merit (1945)

Bibliography 
 Henryk P. Kosk, Generalicja polska t. II, Pruszków 2001
 Janusz Królikowski, Generałowie Wojska Polskiego 1943-1990 t. III: M-S, Toruń 2010, s. 208.

1903 births
Polish People's Army generals
Ukrainian expatriates in Poland
Male veterinarians
Officers of the Order of Polonia Restituta
Recipients of the Silver Cross of Merit (Poland)
Soviet officers in Polish Army 1943-1968
Polish military personnel of World War II
Polish veterinarians
Recipients of the Order of the Cross of Grunwald, 3rd class
1953 deaths